Maria Zaruc (born 2 March 1977) is a Romanian alpine skier. She competed in two events at the 1994 Winter Olympics.

References

1977 births
Living people
Romanian female alpine skiers
Olympic alpine skiers of Romania
Alpine skiers at the 1994 Winter Olympics
Sportspeople from Miercurea Ciuc